Symphlebia tessellata is a moth in the subfamily Arctiinae. It was described by Schaus in 1910. It is found in Costa Rica and Venezuela.

Subspecies
Symphlebia tessellata tessellata (Costa Rica)
Symphlebia tessellata subtessellata (Rothschild, 1916) (Venezuela)

References

Moths described in 1910
Symphlebia